Elwill is a surname. Notable people with the surname include:

Elwill baronets
John Elwill (disambiguation), multiple people